Ibrahim Fathi (1931  2019) was an Egyptian writer, intellectual and critic of the ‘60s. He was called the dean of leftist intellectuals; he has numerous articles and papers published in various Arabic and foreign periodicals. In addition, Fathi was briefly a part of HADETU (Al-Haraka Al-Dimuqratiya Lil-Tahrir Al-Watani; Arabic for: The Democratic Movement for National Liberation). Fathi was honored in 2018 at the Supreme Council of Culture of Egypt for his intellectual output and role in enriching the intellectual life. In addition, Najib Mahfouz praised his writing by criticizing his works.

Life 
He was one of the top high school students in Egypt, and he joined the Faculty of Medicine after moving to Cairo. Together with some of his fellow writers of the late ‘40s and early ‘50s including Yusuf Idris, Salah Hafez, and Mohamed Yusri Ahmed, who were involved in the activities of the Office of Writers and Artists, Fathi was a part of a literary movement. He also translated and wrote several books, beginning by translating Defeat (original: al-hazīmah), the Arabic translation of a novel by Russian writer Alexander Fadeyev. Moreover, Fathi worked as a politician for the Egyptian Left.

In 1959, he was imprisoned for his political affiliations. After being released in 1964, he started his thought and criticism project. His articles were published in poetry and cultural magazines, as well as in Yahya Haqqi’s magazine, Al-Majalla. Given his knowledge of English and French, he edited a section of the magazine that deals with presenting topics discussed in foreign magazines.

He contributed in founding a political organization that brought together young poets, critics, writers and journalists, such as poets Abdel Rahman el-Abnudi, Sayed Hijab, critics Sabri Hafez, Ghalib Halasa and Sayed Khamis, writers Gamal al-Ghitani and Yahya Taher Abdullah, journalist Salah Essa, and translator Khalil Kalfat. Therefore, he was detained once again in September 1966. French philosopher Jean-Paul Sartre’s condition for visiting Cairo prior to the June War, however, was for them to be released.

He also participated in founding The Writers of Tomorrow Society, which has played a prominent role in Egyptian cultural, intellectual and political life since the end of the ‘60s. The Society published some literary publications, most notably The Face of Egypt poetry collection by Zayn al-Abideen Fuʼad, Entrance to Tagore Gardens by Izzat Amer and Thirsty for Seawater by Mohammed Ibrahim Mabrouk.

He also wrote the introduction of the story collection Papers of Love and Thirst by Mohammed Abdel Rahman and poetic works of Samir Abdel Baqi and Sayed Hijab upon being published by Dar Al Fikr Publishing.

Activity 
He began his career by translating Defeat (original: al-hazīmah), the Arabic translation of a novel by Russian writer Alexander Fadeyev, and then wrote several articles and papers published in Arab and foreign periodicals. He was honored by the Ministry of Culture, represented by the Higher Council of Culture, for his many works, which enriched intellectual life. He cofounded the magazine Galerie 68, which introduced a qualitative culture involving a number of writers, poets and intellectuals. He also cofounded Gam'iyat Kuttab Al-Ghad (Arabic for: The Association of the Writers of Tomorrow), which has had an impact on cultural, intellectual and political life since the end of the ‘60s.

He called himself "the sidewalk critic" as he used to meet writers outside the institutional framework where he kept up with their works of criticism.

He had a weekly seminar in Atelier Cairo in the ‘80s and ‘90s, where he discussed literary and intellectual works.

His book The Narrative World of Naguib Mahfouz received considerable attention for resisting the negative view of the left about Mahfouz’s writings. He also wrote important articles preaching about ‘60s generation writers outside political organizations and was the first to present Ibrahim Aslan, Yahya Taher Abdullah, Mohamed el-Bisatie, Mohamed Hafez Rajab, Bahaa Taher and Gamal al-Ghitani.

Works 

 The Fictional World of Naguib Mahfouz
 Narrative and Critical Discourse in Egypt
 The Short Story and Epic Speech of Najib Mahfouz
 The Comedy of Totalitarianism
 His book on the American Nobel Prize winning novelist, Saul Bellow: The Split Persona of the Jewish Novelist.
 Glossary of Literary Terms
 Marxism and the Systematic Crisis
 Henri Curiel against the Arab Communist Movement

Translations 

 Les règles de l'Art (French for: The Rules of Art) by Pierre Bourdieu
 Questions de sociologie (French for: Sociology in Question) by Pierre Bourdieu
 The Cambridge History of Literary Criticism: Romanticism
 The Crisis of Historical Knowledge by Paul Veyne
 Dialectical Materialism by Henri Lefebvre
 Hegel’s Ontology and the Theory of Historicity by Herbert Marcuse

Death 
He died on October 3, 2019 after returning from Cairo to London, spending the last 10 years of his life between Cairo and London accompanied by his wife, Hanaa Suleiman.

References 

Egyptian literary critics
Egyptian translators
Writers from Cairo
1930 births
2019 deaths